British Columbia (Public Service Employee Relations Commission) v British Columbia Government Service Employees' Union [1999] 3 SCR 3,  – called Meiorin for short – is a Supreme Court of Canada case that created a unified test to determine if a violation of human rights legislation can be justified as a bona fide occupational requirement (BFOR).

Background 
Before Meiorin, Human Rights violations were treated in one of two ways; either as "direct discrimination", pursuant to the analysis in Ontario (Human Rights Commission) v Etobicoke (Borough of), [1982] 1 SCR 202; or as "adverse effects discrimination", pursuant to the analysis in Ontario (Human Rights Commission) v Simpsons-Sears Ltd, [1985] 2 SCR 536. Academic writing deeply criticized this bifurcation of analysis as arbitrary and unhelpful in protecting equality rights. With the Meiorin case, the court decided to confront this criticism and refashion the analysis.

Facts 
Tawney Meiorin was employed as a firefighter by the British Columbia Ministry of Forests. Three years after being hired, the government adopted a series of fitness tests that all employees were required to pass. She passed all the tests except for one that required her to run 2.5 km in 11 minutes. After four attempts, her best time was 49.4 seconds over the maximum allowed. As a result, she was fired.

Reasoning of the Court 
Though the fitness tests had a valid purpose of ensuring safety, the court found that the research that the tests were based on was incomplete and "impressionistic" and did not take into account the differences between men and women in establishing a standard.

To reach this conclusion, the court examined the previous methods of analyzing Human Rights violations, noting where they were deficient, and then proposed a new "Meiorin Test" to which the current facts are applied.

McLachlin J (as she then was) noted that the greatest deficiency in having two different approaches is that one afforded a greater amount of remedy than the other which provoked parties to abuse this distinction. There was the further problem that it had the overall effect of legitimizing systemic discrimination. As well, it created a dissonance between Human Rights analysis and Charter analysis.

Meiorin test 
An employer can justify the impugned standard by establishing on the balance of probabilities:

 that the employer adopted the standard for a purpose rationally connected to the performance of the job; 
 that the employer adopted the particular standard in an honest and good faith belief that it was necessary to the fulfilment of that legitimate work-related purpose; and 
 that the standard was reasonably necessary to the accomplishment of that legitimate work-related purpose. To show that the standard is reasonably necessary, it must be demonstrated that it is impossible to accommodate individual employees sharing the characteristics of the claimant without imposing undue hardship upon the employer.
(per McLachlin, emphasis added)

Rational connection 
In practice, this step has been shown to be easily satisfied. It is mostly used  to motivate the parties to identify what the general purpose or goal of the standard is, and will only fail in the most egregious cases. This step has a close connection to the "rational connection" inquiry within the Oakes test which has been shown to have similar effect.

Good faith 
This step addresses the subjective element of test. Though it is not essential to the determination of a BFOR it captures many "direct discrimination" cases.

Undue hardship 
This step is the most decisive of them all. It must show that reasonable alternatives and accommodations have been looked into and reasonably dismissed due to undue hardship.

Sopinka J, in Central Okanagan School District No 23 v Renaud [1992] 2 SCR 970, stated, "[T]he use of the term 'undue' infers that some hardship is acceptable; it is only 'undue' hardship that satisfies this test." The exact measurement of undue hardship is the combination of a variety of factors. Wilson J identified several in Alberta Dairy Pool including financial costs of accommodations, interchangeability of the workforce and facilities, and the interference of other employees rights.

At paragraph 65 of Meiorin, McLachlin J suggests six lines of inquiry to consider:

Has the employer investigated alternative approaches that do not have a discriminatory effect, such as individual testing against a more individually sensitive standard?
If alternative standards were investigated and found to be capable of fulfilling the employer's purpose, why were they not implemented?
Is it necessary to have all employees meet the single standard for the employer to accomplish its legitimate purpose or could standards reflective of group or individual differences and capabilities be established?
Is there a way to do the job that is less discriminatory while still accomplishing the employer's legitimate purpose?
Is the standard properly designed to ensure that the desired qualification is met without placing an undue burden on those to whom the standard applies?
 Have other parties who are obliged to assist in the search for possible accommodation fulfilled their roles? As Sopinka J. noted in Renaud, supra, at pp. 992–96, the task of determining how to accommodate individual differences may also place burdens on the employee and, if there is a collective agreement, a union.

See also
 List of Supreme Court of Canada cases

External links
 
 LEAF's intervener factum

Supreme Court of Canada cases
Canadian civil rights case law
Labour relations in Canada
1999 in Canadian case law
Anti-discrimination law in Canada
Labour relations in British Columbia